Miloslav is a Slavic masculine given name, derived from the Slavic root mil-, "merciful" or "dear", and -slav glory.

Name variants 
 feminine form: Miloslava
 diminutive form: Miloš
 Polish: Miłosław/Miłosława
 Czech feminine: Miloslava

Name Days 
Czech: 18 December
Slovak: 3 July

Men 
 Miloslav Fleischmann, Czechoslovak hockey player
 Miloslav Gureň, Czech hockey player
 Miloslav Hamr,  Czech world champion tennis player
 Michal Miloslav Hodža, Slovak national revivalist
 Miloslav Hořava, Czech hockey player
 Jozef Miloslav Hurban, Slovak 
 Miloslav Ištvan, Czech composer
 Miloslav Kabeláč, Czech composer and conductor
 Miloslav Konopka, Slovak hammer thrower
 Miloslav Kousal, Czech footballer
 Miloslav Mečíř, Slovak professional tennis player
 Miloslav Navrátil, Czech darts player
 Miloslav Pokorný, Czech hockey player
 Miloslav Ransdorf, Czech politician
 Miloslav Rechcigl, Sr., Czech politician, miller, business executive and editor for Radio Free Europe
 Miloslav Schmidt, Slovak Esperantist
 Miloslav Šimek, Czech comedian
 Miloslav Topinka, Czech poet
 Miloslav Valouch, Czech physicist and mathematician
 Miloslav Vlk, a head of Czech Catholic Church
 Miloslav Vlček, Czech politician
 Miloslav Samardžić, Serbian author and historian

Women
Miloslava Tumová
Miloslava Rezková
Miloslava Misáková
Miloslava Svobodová
Miloslava Vostrá

See also

 Slavic names

External links 
Behind the Name

Czech masculine given names
Slovak masculine given names
Slavic masculine given names